Karu P. Esselle is an Australian scholar, professor, inventor and engineer. He is the Distinguished Professor in Electromagnetic and Antenna Engineering at University of Technology Sydney, Australia. He was named The Professional Engineer of Australia for 2022 by Engineer Australia - the national body that oversees engineering practice and profession in Australia. He is also a visiting professor of electronic engineering at Macquarie University in Sydney, Australia. 

Distinguished Professor Esselle's other most recent awards include the top Space award in Australia – the “Winner of Winners” Excellence Award – as well as the Academic of Year Award at the 2022 Australian Space Awards, UTS 2022 Chancellor's Medal (which is the top Research Excellence award at UTS), Engineers Australia 2022 Sydney Professional Engineer of the Year title and the Bradfield Award (in addition to the national title mentioned previously), and both the most prestigious Excellence Award and the Academic of the Year Award at 2021 Australian Defence Industry Awards.

He was named a Fellow of the Royal Society of New South Wales in 2020. He is also a Fellow of the Institute of Electrical and Electronics Engineers (IEEE) and a Fellow of Engineers Australia. In 2019, The Australian Special Report on Research named Esselle the National Research Field Leader in the field of Microelectronics and Electronic Packaging in Engineering as well as the National Research Leader in the field of Electromagnetism (in Physics & Mathematics Disciplines).

He was the leader of the team that designed the high-gain antenna system on board the world's first entirely Ka-band CubeSat spacecraft - Audacy Zero. The space craft was made by Audacy, USA, and launched to space in December 2018 by SpaceX's Falcon 9 rocket. This is believed to be the first Australian-designed high-gain antenna system launched to space since CSIRO-designed antenna systems on board Australia's own FedSat satellite launched in 2002.

Esselle has globally chaired the Distinguished Lecturer Program of IEEE Antennas and Propagation Society from2018 to 2020. Nationally, he was the chair of IEEE New South Wales (Australia) from 2016 to 2017, and vice chair from 2014 to 2015.

He and his co-authors were awarded the 2019 Motohisa Kanda Award for the most cited paper in the previous five years in IEEE Transactions on Electromagnetic Compatibility. He also won the 2019 Macquarie University Research Excellence Award for Innovative Technologies, a 2019 Australian Research Council Discovery International Award, the 2017 Excellence in Research Award from the Faculty of Science and Engineering, the 2017 Engineering Excellence Award for Best Innovation, the 2017 Highly Commended Research Excellence Award from Macquarie University, the 2017 Certificate of Recognition from IEEE Region 10, and the 2016 Engineering Excellence Awards for Best Published Paper from IESL NSW Chapter.

Distinguished Professor Esselle was one of the three Finalists for 2021 Australian Museum national Eureka Prize for Outstanding Mentor of Young Researchers and the Runner-up to the same prize in 2020.

Previously he has been awarded BSc degree in Electronic and Telecommunication Engineering with First Class Honours from the University of Moratuwa, Sri Lanka, and MASc and PhD degrees in Electrical Engineering from the University of Ottawa, Canada.

References 

Fellow Members of the IEEE
Living people
Australian electrical engineers
Year of birth missing (living people)